Matti Saari may refer to:
 the current editor-in-chief of the Finnish Apu family magazine
 Matti Juhani Saari (1986–2008), perpetrator of the Kauhajoki school shooting

See also 
 Matti (given name), a Finnish version of the name Matthew 
 Saari, a Finnish locality